Marko Vego (8 January 1907 – 26 February 1985) was a Bosnian and Yugoslav archaeologist, epigrapher and historian.

Biography 
Vego was born in Čapljina (Bosnia and Herzegovina) to father Jozo who was a worker at a tobacco station. Vego finished a Široki Brijeg classical gymnasium, the Faculty of Theology at the University of Freiburg (Germany) and the University of Zagreb (Croatia), Faculty of Philosophy also at the University of Zagreb and a professorial exam in Belgrade, Serbia. He wrote a doctoral thesis titled "History of Zachlumia from the coming of Slavs to uniting with Bosnia in 1322" at the Faculty of Philosophy in Zagreb. He did not present it due to some unexplained circumstances.

Vego worked as a history teacher at the State Real Gymnasium in Nikšić, Montenegro from 1938 to 1944. He also took part in the resistance movement in the Second World War. He was a professor at the first Teacher Course in Trebinje and advanced to the status of the Trebinje Partisan Gymnasium principal on February 22, 1945. In 1946 and 1947 he was the principal of the State Real Gymnasium in Mostar, Bosnia and Herzegovina, and since September 9, 1947 he worked as a professor at the Teacher Course in Sarajevo. In 1949–50 he was the principal of the Teacher School in Sarajvo. From August 28, 1950 to December 9, 1957 he was the director of the National Museum of Bosnia and Herzegovina in Sarajevo.

Marko Vego retired in 1965. He received several awards in Bosnia and Herzegovina for his work (the most important one is the "27. juli award"). Vego's subject of focus were mostly medieval times and he was best known for his work in archaeology, numismatics, epigraphy and topographical history of medieval Bosnia. He published more than 300 works. He died in Sarajevo.

Bibliography 
Povijest Humske zemlje (Hercegovine), Samobor, 1937
Ljubuški. Srednjovjekovni nadgrobni spomenici Bosne i Hercegovine VI, Sarajevo, 1954
Don Ivan Musić i Hrvati u Hercegovačkom ustanku 1875.–1878. godine, Sarajevo, 1955 (self-published)
Naselja srednjovekovne bosanske države, Sarajevo, 1957
Historijska karta srednjovjekovne bosanske države, Sarajevo, 1957, 1978
Historija Broćna od najstarijih vremena do turske okupacije, Sarajevo, 1961
Zbornik srednjovjekovnih natpisa Bosne i Hercegovine I, Sarajevo, 1962
Zbornik srednjovjekovnih natpisa Bosne i Hercegovine II, Sarajevo, 1964
Zbornik srednjovjekovnih natpisa Bosne i Hercegovine III, Sarajevo, 1964
Bekija kroz vijekove, Sarajevo, 1964
Zbornik srednjovjekovnih natpisa Bosne i Hercegovine IV, Sarajevo, 1970
Iz istorije srednjovjekovne Bosne i Hercegovine, Sarajevo, 1980
Historija Brotnja od najstarijih vremena do 1878. godine, Čitluk, 1981
Postanak srednjovjekovne bosanske države, Sarajevo, 1982

References 
 
 
 
 
 
 

1907 births
1985 deaths
People from Čapljina
Epigraphers
Bosnia and Herzegovina medievalists
Historians of Bosnia and Herzegovina
20th-century Bosnia and Herzegovina historians
Yugoslav historians
Bosnia and Herzegovina archaeologists
Yugoslav archaeologists
20th-century archaeologists
Faculty of Humanities and Social Sciences, University of Zagreb alumni
University of Freiburg alumni